The ancient legend of Khamba and Thoibi is one of the epic cycles of incarnations of Meitei mythology and folklore, that is originated from Moirang kingdom of Ancient Kangleipak (early Manipur).

Among the countless retelling editions of the epic story, the "Khamba Thoibi Sheireng", a Meitei language epic poem, containing 39,000 lines, that is considered as the national epic of the Manipuris, is the magnum opus of its author Hijam Anganghal, the "Bard of Samurou".

Background 
Moirang was created by the God Thangching (Thangjing). The first King of Moirang at the beginning era of the kingdom was Iwang Fang Fang Ponglenhanba, who was born of Moirang Leima Nangban Chanu Meirapanjenlei. He attacked tribal villages, brought Thanga under his rule, and fixed his boundaries to the north, where the Luwang King bore sway. He brought in captives, and buried the heads of his fallen enemies in the Kangla or Royal enclosure. Then the God Thangching bethought himself that the King and
his subjects were so prosperous that they were likely to forget their duties to him, and after taking counsel sent seven Gods, Yakhong Lai, to frighten the King and his people. At night there were mysterious sounds, but the soldiers at first could find no one. Then, when the sounds occurred a second time, they became aware of the Gods, the Yakhong Lai, and reported what they had seen to the King, who took counsel of his ministers. They besought him to call the famous maibi Santhong Mari Mai Langjeng Langmei Thouba. She was in the fields cultivating, but came running, whence (says the historian) all the dwellers of Moirang say apaiba ("to fly"), instead of chenba, ("to run") which is the ordinary Meitei language word. The King begged the maibi "very respectfully to raise the Khuyal Leikhong which the angry storm raised by the Gods had blown down, and by way of showing his respect said, "If you cannot raise the Khuyal Leikhong, I shall kill you." The maibi persuaded the seven Gods to tell her the hymn, and ordered her to convey a message to the King, who was bidden to send all the maibas and maibis of the country to sleep in the temple of Thangching wearing their sacred clothes. When she went to the Khuyal Leikhong she saw Pakhangba there. She raised the edifice by means of the hymn and then gave the message to the King, who bade the maibas and maibis go and sleep in the temple of Thangching in their sacred clothes. There in their dreams they were instructed to divide the people into sections, some for one duty and some for others. Then the village offices were created and their order of precedence fixed. The maibas chant the name of the God and the maibis ring the bell. Then, when they had told the King all the wonderful things communicated to them in their dreams, they were bidden to do as the God had said. Then the King died and was succeeded by his son Telheiba, so called by reason of his skill with the bow. In his, and in the following reigns, there were raids against tribals and various villages. Then we get into complications, for in the reign of King Laifacheng we are told, the Khumans were wroth with
Konthounamba Saphaba and compassed his death. They took him into a wood and fastened him to a tree and left him, but by the aid of the Gods he broke the creeper and made his way to Moirang where he married and had a son. He left Moirang, and went to the land of the Meiteis. The King kept the child, who by favour of the God Thangching grew so strong that the folk of Moirang begged the King to rid himself of the lad, for he would supplant the King. So they put the lad in chains for seven years, and all that time there fell no rain in Moirang. Then the God Thangching appeared to the lad and told him to ask the King to take off his chains. Then the King set the lad free, and the rain fell, but many had died of fever and cholera. The King implored the lad to pardon him for his cruelty and promised him, that when he was dead the kingdom should be his for seven years, even as many years as the years of his bondage. So it fell out, and for seven years the lad reigned as King where he had been in chains.

Raids against Luwangs on the west against tribal villages, which the historian observes still pay tribute to Moirang, are all we have for a brief space covering some hundred years. The God Thangching kept his interest in the fortunes of the kingdom, and visited the King in his dreams and instructed him in many matters. The village grew and spread, so much so that in the reign of King Thanga Ipenthaba, the small hill of Thanga was broken and the water let out. Then at the instance of two Khuman women the King slew the King of the Khumans whom he met by chance hunting. In a later reign, Moirang is invaded by the Khumans who assembled a force in boats. This force was defeated, and in return the Khuman villages were fired. In the reign of King Chingkhu Telheiba (skilful archer of the hill village), a Khuman, Aton Puremba, shot nine tigers with his bow and arrows and brought their skins to the King, who
sought a gift worthy of the hunter's prowess. He would not
give him clothes or such things. He had no daughter, so he
gave him his wife, and by her the bold hunter had two children
Khamnu and Khuman Khamba. Both their parents died, and by dint of begging from door to door, Khamnu got food for herself and her
baby brother. Day by day the lad grew in strength and courage. So swift was he that none could race against him.
So strong was he that he and he alone dared to seize a mad bull that was raging in the land. Then Chingkhuba Akhuba, brother of King Chingkhuba Telhaiba, ordered his men to seize Khamba and have him trampled to death by the elephant. His sin was that Thoibi had made a coat which she gave to Khamba, for she loved him. The God Thangching warned Thoibi of the peril in which her lover was, and she arose and threatened to kill her father so that Khamba escaped. Then it befell a hunting party that a tiger killed a man in full sight of the King, but Khamba killed the tiger single- handed, and as a reward the King gave him the Princess Thoibi in marriage. 

All the early Kings marry women of the Moirang clan, while even the change of the dynasty, when the son of the Khuman refugee became the King, is not an exception, for the mother of Ura Konthouba was a Moirang woman. Later on there are failures in the direct line, but a brother is recorded as successor. The incident of Khamba and Thoibi has no doubt been worked in by the chronicler, who seems to share the view held by Thangching that the people are forgetting their religious duties and need to be roused by some calamity.

Plot

Fratricide for a necklace 
In the days of Chingkhu Telheiba, King of Moirang, Chingkhu Akhuba was the crown prince, who's the younger brother of the King. The King had no child. The daughter of the crown prince was Thoibi Leima. And in those days Yoithongnai waa King of the Khumans and he had three sons, Haoramhal, Haoramyaima and Haoramtol Louthiba. One day, it happened that Thoiba, the King's soothsayer, and his wife, Chaobi Nongnangmachak, went fishing in a lake at the foot of a hill whereupon there grew a Heibung tree. As the soothsayer rested in the shade of the tree, he saw thereon & necklace of beads which he plucked down and gave to his master, the Khuman King, who set it on the neck of his son Haoramhal. Then, as the King grew old, he set the necklace upon the neck of his second son, and then, last of all, upon the neck of his youngest son Haoramtol. In these days the Luwang King Punsiba built him a new palace and summoned all the Kings to the great feast upon the day when he was minded to enter therein. So the sons of the Khuman King, Haoramhal and Haoramyaima were bidden, and put on their robes of State. And Haoramhal entreated his mother to lend him the necklace, and she hearkened to his entreaty. Soon Haoramtol came home from his sport in the village and found not the necklace though he sought for it diligently. Then he was wrath and took his father's sword and sought his brothers so that he might kill them. Yet to none did he declare his purpose.  So he met his brothers by the way and slew his brother Haoramhal, for on his neck was the necklace, and Haoramyaima fled to Moirang, where he took two women unto him as wives, and they bore
him each a son. Now Parenkoiba was the son of the elder wife, and Thangloihaiba was the son of the younger wife. In his days Parenkoiba took unto him a wife, and she bore him a son whom they called Purenba, and in his days he took unto him a wife, and his wife bore him first a daughter whom they called Khamnu, and thereafter a son whom they called Khuman Khamba.

Fate of the siblings 

Now it chanced that upon a day King Chingkhu Telheiba of Moirang went a hunting in the forest, and when the men fired the reeds, five tigers rushed out, and the men who were with the King fled, all save Purenba who slew the tigers with his spear. So the King gave him his wife, for daughters had he none. And with her he gave rich dowry, even a store of goodly apparel, and he set the brave man in high office with titles of honour that all the folk might know his fame. Thereafter the King's soothsayer chose the names for the children that his wife bore unto him, and the King assented to the names. Then it chanced that Purenba fell ill, for an evil spirit entered into him so that he was vexed with a fever and died. Ere he died he sent for his friends, Nongthonba and Thonglen, and commended his children to their care, and Nongbal Chaoba betrothed his son Feiroijamba to Khamnu. Then his wife, seeing that her husband was indeed dead, could not live when her lord and husband was taken by death from her. So she also died soon, and Thonglen took charge of the two children, but they sorrowed and would not be comforted. So he let them go, and they went to their father's house, and were happy there. But there was none to help them, so Khamnu went among the village folk and husked paddy for them while the women gave the breast to Khamba. Then one day it fell out that Khamnu went to Moirang to the market at the very hour when the Princess Thoibi was wont to do her marketing, and the Princess took note of the strange face, for she knew her not and asked her many questions and gave her gifts of food and jewellery; but Khamba was vexed, for there was nought for him. Khamnu met Thoibi again, who bade her come afishing with her on the Loktak. When the King heard that the women who bore his daughter company were minded to sport on the lake, he gave orders that no man might go on the lake. So Khamnu told Khamba of this and left him at home the next day.

Meeting of the lovers 

As Khamba slept,
in his dream the Goddess Panthoibi came to him in the guise of Khamnu, and bade him get the vegetables together. Khamba woke and wondered if he had indeed seen his sister or if it was a dream, but the God Thangching put it into his mind that he had indeed seen his sister. So he went down to the lake and got a boat there and rowed out, but in a wrong direction, so the God spread a veil of cloud over the hill. Anon a storm arose and blew the boat towards the place where Thoibi was fishing. On a sudden Thoibi turned and saw Khamba standing close to her. She asked Khamnu if she knew the stubborn man who dared disobey the orders of the King, but Khamnu denied all knowledge of him. Khamba stood there not knowing what to do, but when he heard his sister's voice, he went nearer, and Thoibi saw that he was goodly and well fashioned, as if daintily carved by some master hand. Khamba, too, wondered at the beauty of Thoibi, for it was the will of God that they twain should love. Yet again Khamnu denied knowledge of the man, for she feared for him that he would be punished for disobedience. Then Thoibi saw that Khamnu was wearing a piece of cloth which matched Khamba's headdress, and that Khamba wore the bracelet which she herself, but a day before, had given to Khamnu. Then Khamnu owned that he was her younger brother, and Thoibi was gracious to him and gave him of her sweetmeats, and then bade him go home lest the wrath of the King visit him, for he seemed goodly to her eyes. When Thoibi had returned to the Palace she bade Khamnu show her the place wherein she lived. So they went to Khamnu's house, and Thoibi saw that the gate was broken. But she sat on a red cloth near the post on the north side which men call ukoklel. Khamba hid himself in the far corner where there was a mat, for the house was old and full of holes, yet Thoibi said nothing in blame, but only that the house was nice. She asked what the mat in the corner was hung for, and Khamnu told her that there was their God Khumanpokpa (the ancestor of the Khumans). Then Thoibi asked, "May I pray to him, for I seek a mercy of him?" Then, so that Khamba might hear her words, she prayed aloud to the God to give her heart's desire to stay in the house and worship him daily. Then Khamba laughed aloud and both the women heard; then Thoibi said, "Your God has spoken to
me. She sat down in the veranda and Khamba came out and sent his sister to the village to bring some fruit. When she was gone, Thoibi bade her maid Senu go to Khamba bearing gifts to him, and say, "My Lord, my Lady bids me give you these, for she desires to be your servant, and to think of none other. To you will she give herself." So he took the gifts and they two bound themselves by a mighty oath before the God Khuman Pokpa, and drank the water in which the golden bracelet was dipped, and each vowed love to the other. Then Thoibi called Khamnu as "sister" and bade Khamba go out among the folk and show himself to the King's officers.

Exposition of Khamba's true identity 

Khamba went out and joined the young men who were learning to wrestle. An elder who stood by, saw the strength of Khamba and bade him wrestle, and he joined in wrestling, and at last the champion of the countryside invited him to wrestle, but Khamba was not thrown for all that the other knew many devices whereby he had often thrown great men. As it fell out, there passed by Nongthonba, the minister of the King, who stopped and asked the name of the young man whom the champion could not throw. With the great man were the servants who followed him, his clients and those that sought to win his favour.

Then he sent for the great champion and asked of him the name of the young man with whom he strove, "for indeed I know him, yet cannot I mind me of his name." "I know not," said the other, "yet verily is he a strong man, like a rock so hard is he to move, like the might of a river that cannot be stayed." Then he asked of Khamba his name and the name of his sire, and Khamba answering said, "Men call me Khamba, but my sire's name I know not." "What manner of man is this," said the King's minister in wrath," that knows not the name of his sire?" Then Khamba said, "My sire died when I was yet a babe, and my sister brought me to manhood. Peradventure she will know the name of my sire." Then the King's minister remembered the face of the lad, for it was even as the face of one who was his friend, and he was sorrowful, for he had spoken sharply to the lad in reproof. "True is it indeed that the elephant knows not his own brother, and kings forget their sons. Your father died ere his prime, even as a tree dies when men strip it of its bark." So he loved the lad, and in his delight went not to the
King's court, but to his house, where he told the women folk of the lad he had met, and bade them take fine clothes and an offering of dainties, for he was minded that his first-born son should take Khamnu, the sister of Khuman Khamba, to wife even as he had promised to her father. So they went to Khamnu, who hid herself in the women's chamber, and they stood and wept outside, and lamented, so that Khamnu relented and spake with them, and took from their hands the apparel, a dress for the morning and a dress for the time when women gather at the bazar, and a dress for the great days when the Gods make merry. Then ere Khamba set forth on the morrow, Khamnu gave him sage counsel. "If any, jealous, puts a stick in thy path, walk not over it, but round it, for they are minded to do thee harm who are evil. Jostle not in the crowd, for they envy thee." So the lad went with the King's minister to the market-place, where Chingkhu Akhuba, the crown prince sat, and the Minister, with a lowly obeisance, set Khamba before the prince, and told of his sire and of his strength. Then they set him before the King, who was gracious unto him and spoke of his father, and bade them enrol him among his servants, and bade them also set the great wrestler Kongyamba among his servants, and when, according to the custom of the land, they had given largesse to the men of their village, the King bade them gather flowers for the service of the God Thangching on the next day.

Gathering of rare flowers 
At home, Khamba told Khamnu all that had befallen him, and how he purposed to gather flowers for the service of the God on the morrow, and the crown prince told his folk of the prowess and might of the son of his old friend, how the King had enrolled him, the son orphaned in his infancy, the child of a brave man, one who was wise in counsel, well versed in matters of state, and a leader of men in war, and made him his servant among them that bear office, for he was a man of high birth and a glory to his Panna. Then Thoibi said to her father, "In truth you should have honoured him yourself and built him an house, upon the north of your palace, and you should have given him food daily." So she went forth and told her mother that the festival of the Gods was at hand. But she went to see Khamba, and he told her how the King had made him Khunthak Leiroi Hanjaba and
had bidden him gather flowers from the hills. "Great trouble is in store for you if you essay to gather flowers on the hills. Rather will I collect them in the village and in the market"; and she cooked him food for the morrow and tied it in a bundle of leaves, fastening it with seven different kinds of silk. On the next day, Kongyamba came for Khamba and chid him for being late, and, being the elder, bade Khamba carry his food. Khamba was wroth thereat, and flung it on the ground. So they went on to a place where the flowers grew, and Kongyamba marked it with knots tied in the forest and claimed it as the place where his father was wont to gather flowers, and threatened Khamba with the wrath of the King. Then was Khamba wroth, and asked, "Where is the place where my father was wont to gather flowers?" Kongyamba pointed to the hills yet south of where they stood, and thither Khamba went, but he found no flowers. So he prayed to the God Thangjing, and the God had compassion on his servant's distress, and sent a whirlwind, upon whose wings was borne to the nostrils of Khamba a fragrance of many flowers. So Khamba went on and found a tree in a valley below whereon grew many flowers. He made obeisance to the God and did reverence to the tree ere he climbed it. So he gathered the flowers and threw them down, and by the grace of the God not a petal was broken. He sang on the way back the Khullang Isei, honouring the name of the Princess Thoibi, and Kongyamba heard it and questioned him, but Khamba said, "I sing of Thoibi." Then they quarrelled again and fought, because Kongyamba bade Khamba carry all the flowers and Khamba would not. Then they desisted and fell to eating, for it was late, and the smell of the savoury food which Thoibi had prepared for Khamba was very rich, and while Kōng- yamba questioned Khamba about it, the crows came and ate the cakes which Kongyamba had brought for his refreshment. So he was wroth, and when he had returned home, he was enraged with his younger wife, and would not let her wash his feet. But when Khamba had returned home, Thoibi said, "Here is my lord and master", and washed his feet and gave him fruit to eat. Meanwhile Kongyamba sent his men forth to question whence Khamba had got such dainty food, and they went to the Palace to ask of the minister Ningon Lakpa if there had been a feast, but
they came back in sore haste, for Thoibi bade the porters drive them off.

Festival of the Gods 

Then Kongyamba was minded to vex Khamba, so he gathered the village folk at the gateway of Khamba's house, and proclaimed to them all the King's orders, that on the next day, the festival of the Gods, all should be clad in gay robes with jewels of gold and of silver. Then Khamnu came forth and asked him, "What are you saying?" And he answered her roughly, "Don't you have no ears? Have I not proclaimed the will of the King all day long till my lungs are dry and my throat parched? Go to." So she wept for shame, and Khamba wept too, for the thought that he had no bright garments to wear on the morrow. But in the night, as they slept, they dreamed that they saw their father and mother standing by them, and that they told them to go to the house of Thonglen, for there were stored their clothes of honour. So they arose, and even in the night went to the house of Thonglen. The men seized them as thieves, and haled them before Thonglen in the morning, but he knew them as the children of his old friend Purenba, and gave them rich clothes to wear and taught them the dance, and appointed men to follow Khamba and women to serve Khamnu. Also he sent men to build their house anew. Then Senu and Thoibi came to the house bearing gifts of raiment and jewellery for Khamnu and Khamba, but they were perplexed, for they knew not the house, so well and truly had the men built it anew. And Thoibi was sore vexed when she saw Khamnu and Khamba in the verandah wearing rich clothes, for she feared that Khamba had married the daughter of some rich man. Then Feiroijamba, the son of Nongtholba, who was betrothed to Khamnu, joined them, and they went to the Loktak lake, where they met the Princess Thoibi riding in a rich palanquin. Then Kongyamba distributed the flowers among the great men, to the King first and then to the Queen, and then to the High officers of state. And Khamba, greatly fearing, asked counsel of the Maibi Hanbi, who first set flowers before the God Thangjing. Then Khamba presented flowers to the great ones, first to the King, then to the Queen, and then to the High officers of state. Right pleased were they all with the flowers set before them by Khamba, and they gave him rare gifts, many times more than the customary presents which they had given to Kongyamba.
Then the dancing began, and Kongyamba and his wives danced. Then Khamba and Thoibi danced and sang before the God (Thangching), and their party was great, and the people gathered together and shouted with joy as they danced, whirling together, till at last they knelt in salutation before the God.

The Lamchel 

Then Kongyamba was wroth and spake bitter words, and on the morrow the folk began to practise for the Lamchel and the wrestling, and the officers of the Pannas were bidden to choose their champions. So they chose Khamba, for he ran steadily in long strides with his chest low, even as those run who run far. They set him before Nongbal, who ran with his head high, swiftly indeed, but for a short distance. Then they ordained that this year the race be long. So of the two parties, both of the wrestlers and of those who run, Khamba was the chief, while Kongyamba was chief of the other parties. The Leikairakpas were bidden to watch the start, and all the night Kongyamba talked with his men how best they might hinder and overcome the party of Khamba for, said he, "Many are the races I have won, and heavy will be my disgrace if this year I am second to Khamba." And Khamnu feared for Khamba lest the friends of the other should do him harm, for they were many. On the morrow Nongbal Kongyamba set forth early with his party, and one said to another, "It is evil for the land if a poor man win the race. It betokeneth scarcity more than the folk can bear. Let us say this among the people ere the race be run." So they hailed Khamba when he arrived, and said, "Hast not heard that thou art not numbered among those that run? Thy name is not set in the list." And the people that stood by assented thereto, and Kongyamba said, "Of evil import is it that a poor man such as thou should run, for it betokeneth scarcity in the land more than the folk can bear." So Khamba believed and returned home very sorrowful at heart, and told his sister all that had been said to him. Then Khamnu bade him go to her father-in-law and tell him all. Then Khamba met Leikairakpa Nongtholba, who was vexed with him and passed him in scorn, but Khamba ran before him and bowed himself to the ground before him and told him all. Then they went before the King, and the King bade Khamba run if there was yet time. So Khamba
and his brother-in-law Feiroijamba sped to the starting-place, and they saw the runners kneeling and the bundle of grass was yet hoisted. So they shouted, "We bear the King's order," but the people shouted so that the runners started, and Kongyamba taunted Khamba, "Run with me", he said, but Khamba answered, "Not yet my friend." Then they entreated the Leikairakpas, and Khamba went to the appointed place and there worshipped the Gods, and then he too shouted, and so swiftly he ran that he overtook Feiroijamba whose pony was startled and ran away. Then the people of Kongyamba were fain to stay him, but he dashed them aside. At last he caught up Kongyamba, who ran slowly, for he was tired. Then fifteen horsemen, the men from the villages of Kongyamba, tried to stay Khamba, and in his mind Thonglen was aware of the evil things they did, and the tears came to his eyes and he started up and asked leave of the King to see what things they were doing to Khamba. Then Khadarakpa, the friend of Kongyamba, and Nongtholba set forth together, and Thoibi gave them pan, a gift for the swiftest in the race. Then turn by turn the twain ran, first one then the other, gaining but a little, and the women cried out to them. Then Khamnu cried out, "Run on, Khamba, for thy Father's honour", and Thonglen shouted to him, "Here is the lion thy Father touched, leap up and break his horn", and Khamba saluted the King and leapt up seven cubits high and brake the horn of the lion (Kangla Sha). Then Kongyamba came up and in his turn greeted the King. Yet the King was more pleased with Khamba and gave him a gold embroidered coat, and the Queen gave him rich apparel, and the King's ministers heaped gifts upon him. So in the wrestling Khamba was the champion, and he surpassed all in putting the stone and tossing the caber. Then he and his sister gave largesse of many cloths among the elders of the village.

Capturing the feral bull 

Then Kongyamba bethought him how best he might work evil upon Khamba. But the Gods taught him no hint of evil devices in his dreams, and he despaired greatly. Then he built himself a hut, wherein he might consult a familiar spirit, but this availed him not. Then it fell out that one day he met women from Khuman fishing in the waters of Moirang, and he questioned them. "Ye women of Khuman, why do ye fish in the river of Moirang? Have ye not the waters of Ikop and Waithou?" And they answered him and said, "There is a great bull that lurks among the reeds that border the waters of Waithou, and already he has killed a man. So we dare not fish there." Then Kongyamba feigned that the God Thangching had given him the gift of divination, and he stood before the King arrayed as a Maibi, and the King asked him "Wherefore art thou come?" and Kongyamba said, "The God Thangching has spoken in mine ears, and I have his behest upon me. Verily saith the God, I am sated with offerings of flesh and fish, but this year my heart longs for the sweet savour of the flesh of the mighty bull that lurks in the reeds that border the waters of Ikop and Waithou. My servant Khamba vows that he will kill it for mine honour and for the welfare of the land, for he is a brave man and set to do some great feat of strength." So they summoned Khamba and asked him of his vow, and he denied it saying, "I have not vowed this vow." Then Kongyamba feigned that Khamba had bribed him with gifts to tell this thing in the presence of the King, and taunted him that all his caste were liars. Then they fell to a quarrel before the King. This was an evil thing to do; none may quarrel or utter words of wrath in the presence of the King. Then the King reproved them, and Khamba did obeisance before the King and said, "If the God will, may I do this thing? I will go, catch the bull." Then was the King pleased with Khamba, and swore that he would give him Thoibi to wife, and Thonglen set seven marks on the lintel post of the kangla, as a token of the King's oath. Then Thangarakpa, wearing a gay headdress of many rare feathers, went with men on an embassy to the King of Khuman to bear tidings of the great sport that was to be. He bare his message to the Khuman King, who sat in the court and talked thereon with his ministers. But they assented not till they heard that one man alone was coming, to kill the bull and that he was of the Khuman stock. So they built machans, 700 for the Khumal folk, and 700 for the Moirang folk. So all was made ready for the morrow. Then, Khamnu, who had treasured many things in her heart, was ill at ease for Khamba, and said, "This great bull was once the Lord of thy father's herd. Go to him, speak thy Father's name in his
ear, and show him this rope of silk." Then Khamba set forth to find the bull. At first he found him not among the reeds. Then he went to a low hill and saw the bull, and went towards him calling him to tease him. Then the bull ran at him, but Khamba bent aside a little and the people cried out, "Are you afraid?" but Khamba answered them, "I fear not; I seek a good stance." Then he stood on firm ground and caught the bull by the horns, and they swayed together as they strove for the mastery. Then Khamba rested on the neck of the bull, who carried him into the jungle. And Khamba spake his Father's name softly into the ear of the bull, and showed him the silken rope. Then the bull remembered the name of his Master and knew the rope, and himself tied it round his own neck. Then Khamba brought the bull to the place where stood Khamnu and Thoibi. Then Kongyamba joined him there and said, "Let me help pull the bull along", and caught the rope, but the bull would not move, and Kongyamba said, "Look, I have rescued Khamba. I share the reward. Khamba had fallen into a ditch." Then Kongyamba's friends shouted aloud, "Lo, he has rescued Khamba", and the Kings were sore troubled to know what was right, so they bade Kongyamba fight the bull in an enclosure, but he was afraid and climbed for safety into a machan. Then Khamba fought the bull bravely; he caught it by the tail suddenly, and then on a sudden let it go so that it fell on its knees. Then he seized it by its neck. Then the Kings did honour to Khamba and gave him many gifts, rich jewellery and clothing, and the Khuman King said to the Moirang King, "My brother, childless am I, let this man be my man and live with me," but the Moirang King would not, and on the morrow Khamba killed the bull in honour of the God Thangching.

Archery ceremony and the oath breaking 
Then it was ordained that at this festival there should be the archery as was customary in honour of the God Thangching, and that Kongyamba should pick up the arrows shot by the King and Khamba should gather those shot by the crown prince Chingkhu Akhuba. It fell out that the crown prince asked his daughter Thoibi to give him his coat of golden embroidery, but she had given it to Khamba. On the morrow when the target was set, the Maibas sang a charm over the arrows and the bow of the King, and the King tried the bow and then loosed the arrows from the string. Kongyamba
stood there girt ready and ran to fetch the arrows which he gave back to the King. Then Khamba girded up his loins, and when the bow and arrows of the crown prince had been charmed, the prince shot and so swiftly ran Khamba to pick them, that his cloth was loosed, and the prince saw and knew the gold embroidered coat below. Wroth, indeed, was he, and when Khamba bowed himself to give him the arrow, he would not take it and turned his face away from him. Then Kongyamba took the arrow from the hand of Khamba and gave it to the prince, who was pleased with him and said, "My daughter Thoibi is thine to wive. In five days will I send thee the marriage gifts." Then Nongtholba asked the crown prince, "Wherefore art thou wroth with Khamba?" and the crown prince said, "I like him not; I will not see his face." Then said Nongtholba, "Is thy daughter a fruit or a flower thus to be given away as a trifle of no worth? On the day when Khamba slew the bull, the King, thy brother, promised her in wedlock to Khamba, in token whereof I set seven notches upon the lintel of the kangla for men to see and know." Then the crown prince said, "That I know not, but what I have said, I have said. My daughter I give to Kongyamba." Then the King was vexed, and the crown prince went to his house and bade his wives get ready the marriage gifts, "for in five days I will give my daughter Thoibi in marriage to Kongyamba." Then, lest Khamnu and Khamba should give him gifts on the appointed day, he ordained that none should sell fruits but by his leave, and leave to buy gave he only unto Kongyamba, and to none other. But Khamba set forth to the village where dwelt Kabui Salang Maiba. When he stood at the gate, the tribals who kept watch and ward there, seized him and took his load straps from him, and haled him to the pakhangphal where sat the Maiba. Then Khamba said, "Wherefore have thy men seized me and taken my load straps from me? I am come hither to see my father's friend the Salang Maiba." Then the Maiba plied him with questions and knew that he was indeed the son of his old friend, and sent off men to gather fruit for him. Then he showed Khamba the spot whereon his Father had done great deeds of valour in battle against the Kabuis. The men brought in two weighty baskets of fruits, and the Maiba added thereto of his store gifts for Thoibi and Khamnu and Khamba. 
Then Khamba took the fruit home and Thoibi set it ready in eleven dishes, and talked with the chief queen, who promised to stand ready with ten of the queens and ten maids to receive the gifts. On the morrow Kongyamba brought his gifts, but Thoibi lay sick with a fever, for an evil spirit had chanced in her path. So the crown prince sent Kongyamba away, saying, "I will send my daughter anon, for she lies sick of a fever." After a while Thoibi arose. Then the crown prince Chingkhu Akhuba himself ailed and lay him down to rest a while. Then Thoibi's maid Senu swept clean the northern portion of the verandah, the place that folk call mangsok, that is set apart for the women, and threw the dust on the southern part that is called phamen, which is set apart for the men. Then she smeared the northern part with fresh mud. Then came the queens and sat in their places, and Khamba's gifts were set before them and they partook of them and gave of them to the people. And it chanced, even as Thoibi had planned, that her Father, the crown prince, who meanwhile had risen and gone with the King to see the men shoot in honour of the God Thangching, returned home parched with thirst and craving the juice of some sour fruit. He asked of the queens, his wives, "Have ye any sour fruit?" and they said, "Lord, we have none," but Thoibi said, "Father, I have fruit in my basket," and she brake the fruit into a silver cup and gave the juice to her father to drink, who relished it and said, "What fruit are these?" Then said Thoibi, "Men call them cha kao and mak kao", and her father saw not the guile in her answer and again said, "These are strange names. Whence come they?" Then said Thoibi, "Father, dost thou not know the fruit? They are the fruit which Khamba, thy son-in-law, has set before thee on his marriage." At this the crown prince Chingkhu Akhuba waxed wroth and threw his silver huga at his daughter. Then Thoibi fainted as if in a trance wrought upon her by the skyey influence of Leimaren and Panthoibi. The prince was greatly terrified thereat, and the women wailed over her. So he said to his daughter, "Child, daughter, wife of Khamba, arise and go to thy husband's kin." Then Thoibi arose, and the prince was wroth again.

Torture by the elephant 

Then crown prince Chingkhu Akhuba sent men to summon Kongyamba, and to say to Khamba, "Come to thy Lord, the crown prince, for he is minded to give thee gifts." Then Kongyamba gathered men together and met
Khamba by the way, and said to him, "Art thou minded to give up Thoibi?" and Khamba answered him and said, "Jest not with me, for I will not give her up." Then they quarrelled and fought, and Khamba threw the man upon the ground and knelt upon his belly and pressed his throat, and was minded to kill him, but the men that stood by, the friends of Kongyamba, dragged him off and beat him and tore his clothes, and bound him so that he could not move. Then the crown prince came up on his great elephant and bade the men beat him. Then they made him fast to the elephant with ropes, but the mahout who bound him, knew that Khamba was innocent, and so bound him that he yet had space to breathe. Then they goaded the elephant, but the God Thangching stayed it so that it moved not. At last Kongyamba took a spear and pricked it so that it moved with the pain. But it harmed not Khamba. Then the dawn broke and the men said "Khamba is dead," and they loosed him from the elephant and moved him away. In the darkness of the night the Goddess Panthoibi came in a dream to Thoibi and said, "Dost thou not know that thy man is bound by thy father's orders to the elephant and they have nearly killed him." Then Thoibi arose and girt her petticoat close to her, taking with her a knife. She found Khamba still tied, and cut the cords that still bound him, and chafed his limbs so that the blood ran through them. Then Khamba came to and knew Thoibi, and bade her send for Khamnu, and one went and fetched her. When she came, she wept for sorrow at the plight of her brother. Then Feiroijamba came and gave help. Then Nongtholba was very wroth for all they had done to Khamba, and bade his son tell it all to the Cheirap. Then the slaves of Thonglen told their lord that Khamba was dead, for the men had bound him to the feet of the elephant, and he was very wroth and went to the Cheirap with all his men armed and girt ready. Then Feiroijamba told the Cheirap thrice how cruelly men had tried to kill Khamba, but the crown prince heeded not the complaint. Yet again Feiroijamba told them, and Nongtholba in his wrath said, "Who is this that dared to touch my son-in-law." Then said the crown prince, "I bade them kill Khamba, and I believed him dead. Vexed am I that he still lives and, therefore, am I not minded to hearken to this complaint." Then said Nongtholba, "My Lord, hast thou the power of life and death?" Then the crown prince answered and said, "Such power have I." Then said Nongtholba, "As I live and while I hold mine office, none shall dare to kill my son-in-law. Upon me is the task of guarding this realm. My counsel is ever before the King. Let us before my Lord the King." So they joined hands and went before their Lord the King, and the King was wroth with the crown prince, for Thoibi had told him all that they had sought to do to her husband. And the King forbade the crown prince to come in, for he said, "Peradventure he seeks to drive me out, and is leagued with mine enemies the Angoms. When he has killed all my captains that are mighty in battle, then will he kill me also." Then Thonglen came to the palace with all his men armed and girt ready, and vowed that he would kill all those who had sought to kill Khamba; but Nongtholba pacified him saying, "Shall a man wrestle with that great elephant and not get hurt?" So Thonglen laid his anger aside. The King sent his own leech to minister to the hurts of Khamba, and sent daily gifts of food and money. And in the court he asked Nongtholba to give him counsel, and he punished all those who had laid violent hands on Khamba, and the crown prince he set in prison, and bade him stay there till Khamba was well again. So Thoibi tended her husband and he was well again. So the King set the crown prince free and hoped that he would bear no malice against Khamba.

Exile of Princess Thoibi 

Crown prince Chingkhu Akhuba called his wives and summoned princess Thoibi, but the princess was tending Khamba. Then he said, "Better be childless than be the father of this evil girl. Sell her to Kubo and let me never see her more." And he would not relent for all that they entreated him. So he summoned Hanjaba, and bade him take the girl to Tamurakpa," and sell her and bring back the price in silver and gold. Then Thoibi told Khamba, and said, "Dear husband, for thy sake I go to Kabaw at my father's bidding. Forget me not, for I will come back." At daybreak she did obeisance to her father and mother, and wept so that the cry of her lamentations was like the thunder, and her mother wept also and all the maids. Then she went to Hanjaba, who had the secret orders of her father to Tamurakpa. He took away all her jewellery, and set out with her. On the way she met Khamba, and he wept with her for the happy days that were gone, and the grief of their separation.
Then Khamba gave her a staff to lean on by the way, but Thoibi planted it by the road and bade it blossom forth with leaves if she kept her love true and chaste for Khamba, and she set a mark upon a stone by the roadside as a token. Then she reached Kubo, where Tamurakpa counted out her price in gold and silver into the hand of Hanjaba. But Tamurakpa had pity on her sorrow and bade her go in and be with his daughter Changning Kanbi. 
The evil women of Kubo whispered to Changning, and persuaded her to send Thoibi forth to catch fish and gather fuel. While she was busied with her task, she dreamed that Khamba was with her, doing even as she herself, but when she woke, she knew that it was but a dream. Then the God Thangching took pity on her, and Tamurakpa bade the women weave each of them a cloth, for he heard them wrangling. Changning sought to reproach Thoibi, and said, "Wayward child thou art. Thou had'st the chance of marrying Kongyamba a goodly man, a scion of a famed race, stout and comely, yet thy love turned to Khamba." And Tamurakpa heard, and his anger was kindled against his daughter, and he was fain to strike her, but Thoibi stayed him. So they wove together, and in the night Changning tore holes with a porcupine quill in the cloth which Thoibi had woven, for she was jealous. When Thoibi arose, she saw all that had been done, but she sat to and so skilfully mended all the holes that Tamurakpa preferred the cloth she had woven, and threw aside the cloth which his daughter had woven.

Trick by father and Counter-trick by daughter 

Once while Thoibi worked at the loom, a wind brought ashes far drifting upon the loom, and Thoibi knew that they had come from Moirang. Then she wept as she thought of her husband and her home, and the God Thangching softened the heart of her father, and he sent men to bring her home again. But he warned Kongyamba and bade him meet her by the way. So Thoibi did obeisance to the deity of Kubo, and thanked Tamurakpa courteously as she went back with the men her father had sent. And when she had come to the place where was the stone on which she had set a mark as a token, she worshipped it and put gold and silver on it; and when she came to the place wherein she had planted the staff which Khamba gave her, she saw that it had blossomed forth with leaves. Then Kongyamba was near and bade his men see if
Thoibi was coming, and they shouted, "Lo, the Princess is at hand." Then Thoibi heard the shout and bade the slaves that Tamurakpa had sent with her as tribute to the King, "Go on and sit near if the man is Khamba, but far apart if he be Kongyamba." She went on and feigned friendship with him, and sat on his red cloth, but placed a stick between them. Then she asked for fruit, and Kongyamba brought her fruit, but she would not eat for she feigned that she ailed after her sojourn in Kubo. Then she asked Kongyamba to let her ride on his pony while he rode in her palanquin. And he was not loth. Then when she was near home, she galloped off on the pony to Khamba's house, and he took her and they all wept for very joy. Then Kongyamba was sore vexed, for the girl had tricked him, and his friends availed him not, and he sought to win the King's ministers to hearken to him, but Thonglen and Nongtholba sent men to guard Khamba and Thoibi.

Trial by ordeal 

On the next day, the matter was set before the King in his court, and he bade them settle the matter by the ordeal of the spear, but as he spake an old woman came forth and said, My Lord King, there is a tiger in the forest hardby that we fear", and the King said, "Let the tiger bear witness herein. Unto him that kills the tiger, will I give the Princess Thoibi." So they summoned the hui rai, and fenced round jungle, and on the morrow the King and his ministers gathered there in machans. So many folk were gathered there that it seemed like a white cloth spread on the ground. Then they twain did obeisance before the King, who laid his behest upon them, and bade them slay the tiger, and he feared for them lest the tiger kill them. So they went and sought the lair of the beast, and in it they found the body of a girl but newly killed. Then they found the tiger, and sought to spear it, but it turned the spears away as they threw them. Then the tiger sprang upon them and bit Kongyamba so that he died, but Khamba wounded the beast, and drove it off. Then he carried Kongyamba to the machan, wherein sat his father. And Thonglen taunted Khamba, "What! art afraid? Thy father slew five tigers and thou fearest one. Go to, I will come and kill the beast." Then Khamba entered the forest once more and found the tiger crouching in a hollow half hidden by the jungle, but in full view of the machan of the King. As the tiger leapt upon Khamba, he speared it through the ravening jaws, so that it died as it fell. Then the King gave rich gifts to Khamba, and bestowed upon him wide lands and rights of fishery, robes of honour, and titles of high fame, and made him master of a salt-well, and ordained that men should call him Pukhramba.

Tragic end after the marriage 
Thereafter Khamba and Thoibi were wedded in high state, and after them Khamnu was wedded to Feiroijamba.
Now it chanced one day that fear entered into Khamba's heart that Thoibi his wife was faithless to him. So he sought to try her and pushed a stick through the wall. Then Thoibi was very vexed at this and cried, "Who dares to annoy me? I am a chaste wife," and thrust the spear through the wall and pierced Khamba. Then he called her and she knew his voice, and went out and carried him in, and was sore stricken with grief when she saw that he was wounded unto the death. As he lay, ere he died, she slew herself upon him.

Editions 
 "The Story of Khamba and Thoibi", an 1877 English language prose, written by G. H. Damant, published as a part of "The Indian Antiquary, Vol. VI. 1877"
 "Khamba and Thoibi", a 1908 English language prose, published as a part of the book "The Meitheis", written by T.C. Hodson
 Khamba Thoibi Sheireng, a 1940 Meitei language epic poem by Hijam Anganghal
 "Khamba Thoibi and Poems on Manipur", a 1963 English language poetry work, by Vimala Raina
 "Khamba and Thoibi: The Unscaled Height of Love", a 1976 English language prose by N. Tombi Singh
 "Khamba Thoibigi Wari Amasung Mahakavya", a Meitei language prose by Khwairakpam Chaoba

In popular culture 

 Kao Faba is a 2020 Meitei language Shumang Kumhei, based on the story of the capture of Kao (bull) by Khuman Khamba, produced by Western Cultural Association in Manipur.
 Kao, the sacred bull is a 2011 Meitei opera produced by the "Laihui Ensemble", based on the story of the capture of Kao (bull) by Khuman Khamba.
 Khambana Kao Phaba (painting), an oil canvas painting by Manipuri artists, M Betombi Singh and Gopal Sharma, is one of the most well known museum series "Exhibit of the Month" of July 2019 in the Indira Gandhi Rashtriya Manav Sangrahalaya in Bhopal, India.
 "Khamba Khamnu" is a 1995 Meitei language feature film, produced by Chandam Shyamacharan for C.S.Films Imphal Produuctions, written by Th. Nodia and directed by Ch. Shyamacharan.
 "Khamba Thoibi" is a 1997 Meitei language feature film, based on the epic story by Hijam Anganghal, produced by Moirangthem Nilamani Singh for Anjana Films, and directed by M. Nilamani Singh.
 "Khamba Thoibi, the epic" is an upcoming Meitei 3D animation feature film.
 "Langon" is a Meitei language feature film, based on the epic of Khamba and Thoibi. 
 Moirang Sai is a traditional Meitei musical performing arts form, that narrates the story of Khamba and Thoibi, with durations spanning over 120 hours.
 Festival of Moirang Shai is a cultural event that aims to popularize the unique culture of the Meitei people at grassroots level, particularly in preserving and promoting "Moirang Sai".

See also 
 Numit Kappa
 Akongjamba and Phouoibi
 Henjunaha and Lairoulembi
 Khuyol Haoba and Yaithing Konu
 Kadeng Thangjahanba and Tonu Laijinglembi
 Ura Naha Khongjomba and Pidonnu
 Wanglen Pungdingheiba and Sappa Chanu Silheibi

Notes

Source

References

External links 

 Khamba Thoibi at 

Classical literature
Epic cycles of incarnations
History of Manipur
Indian literature
Meitei culture
Meitei folklore
Meitei literature